Slamet Irfan Nurcahyono (born 11 July 1983) is an Indonesian professional footballer who plays as a attacking midfielder for Liga 1 club Madura United.

International career 
He made his debut for Indonesia in 2014 FIFA World Cup qualification against Bahrain on 29 February 2012.

Career statistics

International

Honours

Club
Persebaya Surabaya
 Indonesian Premier Division: 2004
Persiba Bantul
 Indonesian Premier Division: 2010–11

References

External links 
 Slamet Nurcahyono at Liga Indonesia
 

1983 births
Living people
Indonesian footballers
People from Jember Regency
Indonesia international footballers
Persebaya Surabaya players
PSS Sleman players
Persiba Bantul players
Persibo Bojonegoro players
Persepam Madura Utama players
Bhayangkara F.C. players
Madura United F.C. players
Indonesian Premier Division players
Liga 1 (Indonesia) players
Association football midfielders
Sportspeople from East Java